Muirgeas ua Cú Ceanainn (died 1037) was King of Uí Díarmata.

Overview

Muirgeas was a grandson of Cú Ceanain mac Tadhg, and seems to have reigned from 1021 to 1037. He was the first member of the Uí Díarmata dynasty to use the name ua Cú Ceanainn in a quasi-surname context. All subsequent kings and lords of Uí Díarmata, to the end of the 16th century, would use it as a surname, latter-day Concannon]

Events of his reign in Connacht and Ireland included:

1022 - Death of High King Máel Sechnaill mac Domnaill. The Norse of Dublin were defeated by the Ulaid in a naval engagement. Very great showers of hail fell in the summer, the stones of which were the size of wild apples; and great thunder and lightning succeeded, so that men and cattle were destroyed throughout Ireland.
1023 - The Termon of Cluain-mic-Nois was plundered by Gadhra Mór mac Dundach, and carried off many hundred cows from thence. King Tadg in Eich Gil of Connacht, fought a war in Uí Briúin
1032 -An eclipse of the sun on 31 August. Death of Mughron Ua Nioc, Abbot of Tuam.
1034 - Dubhdaingean, lord of Connaught, was slain by the Connaughtmen themselves.

References

 The Tribes and Customs of Hy-Many, John O'Donovan, 1843
 The Parish of Ballinasloe, Fr. Jerome A. Fahey.
 https://www.webcitation.org/query?url=http://www.geocities.com/Athens/Aegean/2444/irish/LD.htm&date=2009-10-25+05:47:51
 Vol. 2 (AD 903–1171): edition and translation
 Annals of Ulster at CELT: Corpus of Electronic Texts at University College Cork
 Annals of Tigernach at CELT: Corpus of Electronic Texts at University College Cork
Revised edition of McCarthy's synchronisms at Trinity College Dublin.

People from County Galway
1037 deaths
11th-century Irish monarchs
Year of birth unknown